Aglaia Mafalda Pezzato (born 22 April 1994) is an Italian swimmer.

She competed at the 2016 Summer Olympics in Rio de Janeiro.

References

External links
 

1994 births
Living people
Italian female swimmers
Olympic swimmers of Italy
Swimmers at the 2016 Summer Olympics
Medalists at the FINA World Swimming Championships (25 m)
Universiade medalists in swimming
Universiade bronze medalists for Italy
Medalists at the 2019 Summer Universiade